New Bongaigaon Railway Colony is a census town in Bongaigaon district in the Indian state of Assam.

Demographics
 India census, New Bongaigaon Railway Colony had a population of 15,847. Males constitute 54% of the population and females 46%. New Bongaigaon Railway Colony has an average literacy rate of 77%, higher than the national average of 59.5%: male literacy is 82%, and female literacy is 70%. In New Bongaigaon Railway Colony, 10% of the population is under 6 years of age.Various schools, Vivekanada Vidyapith, Adarsha Bidya Mandir, Bongaigaon Railway HS School, Bijicolony school has contributed lots towards it.
The geographical co-ordinates of the town is 26d 28m 43s N, 90.00d 30m 50.00s approx.

Railway colonies
The colonies are well distributed well defined as every colonies has their own name e.g. r.p.f. colony, north west colony, westcolony, central colony, mt. view colony, officers colony etc.
the city is full of various diversities contributing to its development.
the city is surrounded by hills on all directions. on the east there are hills of  birjhora and chaprakata, Bhutan hills on the north, simlaguri hills on south, and a hill near salakati on west.

Leisure
As the town called as "The City Of Dreams" people of this town has many interests. there are many playgrounds / fields in the colony areas like the northwest colony field as called as " r.p.f. field", forward sporting field ("gangstar" team playground), sitlabari field etc.
Certain game events held regularly in this area like cricket events (mainly organised by gangster cricket team, sbc club, forward club, v12 and more) and football events also (organised by sbc club, forward club, etc.)...
Images just click on
https://www.panoramio.com/photo/79721566
https://www.panoramio.com/photo/79721489
https://www.panoramio.com/photo/79721404

New Bongaigaon Railway Station
one of the big stations from the state of assam. the uniqueness is that .New Bongaigaon Jn. also known as floating station is so called because some part of its platform is built over a river named "Tuniya river"

References

Cities and towns in Bongaigaon district
Bongaigaon
Railway Colonies in India